Hot Country Songs and Country Airplay are charts that rank the top-performing country music songs in the United States, published by Billboard magazine. Hot Country Songs ranks songs based on digital downloads, streaming, and airplay not only from country stations but from stations of all formats, a methodology introduced in 2012. Country Airplay, which was first published in 2012, is based solely on country radio airplay, a methodology that had previously been used from 1990 to 2012 for Hot Country Songs.

In the issue of Billboard dated January 1, 2022, "Fancy Like" by Walker Hayes held the top spot on the Hot Country Songs chart, and "Thinking 'Bout You" by Dustin Lynch and MacKenzie Porter was atop the Country Airplay chart; both songs retained their positions from the final chart of 2021. "Thinking 'Bout You" was replaced at number one in the issue dated January 22 by Michael Ray's "Whiskey and Rain", which reached the top spot in its 65th week on the chart.  This tied a record set by Travis Denning's "After a Few" in June 2020 for the slowest climb to the top of that listing. In April, Elle King and Miranda Lambert's "Drunk (And I Don't Wanna Go Home)" became the first duet by two female vocalists to top a Billboard chart based on country music radio play in nearly 30 years, since Reba McEntire and Linda Davis's "Does He Love You" in November 1993.

Cody Johnson achieved his first number one single in February, when "'Til You Can't" topped Hot Country Songs, and Breland achieved the same feat on the Country Airplay chart in April when he collaborated with Dierks Bentley and Hardy on "Beers on Me". In May, Ashley McBryde reached number one for the first time when her collaboration with Carly Pearce, "Never Wanted to Be That Girl", topped the Country Airplay chart. Mitchell Tenpenny gained his first chart-topper in August when "At the End of a Bar", a collaboration with Chris Young, reached number one on the airplay chart, and Riley Green made his first appearance in the peak position in November when his collaboration with Thomas Rhett, "Half of Me", topped the same listing. Tyler Hubbard gained his first solo number one in November when "5 Foot 9" topped Country Airplay; he had previously spent time at number one as half of the duo Florida Georgia Line. In doing so, Hubbard became the first artist to gain a country number one as part of a duo or group and repeat the feat as a solo act.  In December, Bailey Zimmerman gained his first number one when "Fall in Love" topped the airplay chart, making him the first artist to top the chart with their first entry since October 2021. Morgan Wallen achieved the most number-one country songs in 2022, with five of his songs topping one or both charts. One of these, "Wasted on You", returned to number one on Hot Country Songs 16 months after its first appearance in the top spot in January 2021; "You Proof", also by Wallen, was the year's longest-running number one on both charts with nineteen weeks in the top spot on Hot Country Songs and nine on Country Airplay. It would go on to ultimately spend ten weeks at the top on the latter chart, setting a new record for the longest-running number one single based strictly off country radio airplay, surpassing Lonestar's "Amazed" (1999) and Alan Jackson and Jimmy Buffett's "It's Five O'Clock Somewhere" (2003), which each spent eight weeks at the top. With its time at number one spanning three separate runs, "You Proof" became the first single to rebound to the top after multiple songs reached number one in between. In total, Wallen spent 31 weeks at number one on Hot Country Songs, and 13 on Country Airplay, the most by any act on each listing. Kane Brown and Cole Swindell were the only other acts to achieve more than one number-one country single during 2022, with two each. Swindell's "She Had Me at Heads Carolina" was the only other single besides "You Proof" to spend more than three weeks at the top, with four.

Chart history

See also
2022 in country music
List of artists who reached number one on the U.S. Hot country chart
List of Top Country Albums number ones of 2022

References

2022
Number-one country singles
United States Country Singles